Jacques Morisson (28 March 1907 – 8 February 1964) was a French ice hockey player. He competed in the men's tournament at the 1936 Winter Olympics.

References

1907 births
1964 deaths
Olympic ice hockey players of France
Ice hockey players at the 1936 Winter Olympics
Place of birth missing